Corinth is a town in Orange County, Vermont, United States.  The population was 1,455 at the 2020 census.

Local services include a general store, post office, doctor's office, library, and ball field.

Geography
According to the United States Census Bureau, the town has a total area of 48.5 square miles (125.7 km2), of which 48.5 square miles (125.7 km2) is land and 0.04 square mile (0.1 km2) (0.04%) is water. The Waits River flows through northeastern Corinth.

Corinth contains seven villages: East Corinth, West Corinth, South Corinth, Corinth Center, Corinth Corners, Cookville, and Goose Green.

Demographics

As of the census of 2000, there were 1,461 people [1,367 per 2010, a loss of 96 people. All other statistics are per the 2000 census, including the following], 535 households, and 410 families residing in the town.  The population density was 30.1 people per square mile (11.6/km2).  There were 728 housing units at an average density of 15.0 per square mile (5.8/km2).  The racial makeup of the town was 98.77% White, 0.21% African American, 0.21% Native American, 0.14% from other races, and 0.68% from two or more races. Hispanic or Latino of any race were 1.03% of the population.

There were 535 households, out of which 36.4% had children under the age of 18 living with them, 60.4% were married couples living together, 9.3% had a female householder with no husband present, and 23.2% were non-families. 16.4% of all households were made up of individuals, and 7.3% had someone living alone who was 65 years of age or older.  The average household size was 2.73 and the average family size was 3.02.

In the town, the population was spread out, with 28.1% under the age of 18, 5.5% from 18 to 24, 28.4% from 25 to 44, 25.4% from 45 to 64, and 12.5% who were 65 years of age or older.  The median age was 38 years. For every 100 females, there were 99.3 males.  For every 100 females age 18 and over, there were 97.4 males.

The median income for a household in the town was $32,198, and the median income for a family was $33,646. Males had a median income of $29,964 versus $23,646 for females. The per capita income for the town was $14,431.  About 7.1% of families and 10.7% of the population were below the poverty line, including 12.2% of those under age 18 and 7.7% of those age 65 or over.

Media

Tim Burton's film Beetlejuice (1988) was filmed in East Corinth.

Notable people 

 Tania Aebi, first American woman to sail solo around the world
 Hale K. Darling, Lieutenant Governor of Vermont
 John Lawrence Grattan, leader of U.S. soldiers killed in the Grattan massacre
 Patricia Neway, operatic soprano and musical theater actress
 Reuben Robie, US Congressman
 Alexander Twilight, first African American to serve in a state legislature, and to receive a degree from an American university

References

 
Towns in Vermont
Towns in Orange County, Vermont